The Ghurar al-Hikam wa Durar al-Kalim (literally "exalted aphorisms and pearls of speech") is a comprehensive collection of pietistic and ethical statements and aphorisms attributed to Ali ibn Abi Talib, cousin and son-in-law of the Islamic prophet, Muhammad. This work was compiled by Abdul Wahid al-Tamimi and consists of nearly 11,000 short sayings. It has been translated to English recently.

Compiler
Ghurar al-Hikam was compiled by Qadhi Nasih Al-Deen Abu al-Fath Abd al-Wahid Ibn Muhammad al-Tamimi al-Amudi, who lived in the fifth or sixth century AH. He is described as either a Shafii jurist or a Twelver Shia. In particular, Muhammad Baqir Majlisi, Mirza Abdollah, Mirza Husain Noori Tabarsi, and Ibn Shar Ashoob name him as a Shia scholar in their works. He was a student to al-Ghazali and a teacher to Ibn Shahr Ashoob.

Contents
Ghurar al-Hikam includes 10760 sayings attributed to Ali, which have been sorted alphabetically and divided into ninety one sections. These sayings were collected from various sources such as Nahj al-Balagha, Mi'a Kalema ("hundred sayings" of Ali) by al-Jahiz, Tuhaf al-Uqul and Dastur Ma'alim al-Hikam of Ghazi Ghaza'i. Since al-Tamimi has omitted his sources, the use of Ghurar al-Hikam as a reference book has been viewed as problematic.

Translations and commentaries
Several Persian translations of this book are available but its only existing commentary is by Agha Jamal Kwansari. Tahir Ridha Jaffer has translated this work to English.

See also
Al-Jafr (book)
Al-Jamia
Al-Sahifa al-Sajjadiyya
Book of Fatimah
Khutba
List of Shia books

References

External links
 Ghurar al-Hikam wa Durar al-Kalim

Works about Ali
Shia hadith collections
Books of quotations
Shia bibliography